Arno Chanoch Karlen (May 7, 1937 – May 13, 2010) was an American poet, psychoanalyst, and popular science writer. He won the 1996 Rhone-Poulenc Prize for science books with Plague's Progress.

Biography

Early life
Arno Karlen was born on May 7, 1937 in Philadelphia. His parents were Jewish immigrants from modern-day Belarus and Ukraine who immigrated to the United States in the early 1900s. He was a talented child who was promoted two grades and finished high school at 15. As a teenager, he was interested in literature, science, and classical music. He studied music, and graduated from Antioch College with majors in English and French literature.

Academic career
After he finished college, Karlen wrote for many magazines and spent a couple of years traveling around Europe writing about food and culture. Eventually, he became editor of several magazines, including Holiday and Newsweek, and published a short stories book called White Apples at the age of 24.

In the 1970s, Karlen became an Associate Professor in the English Department Writing Program at Penn State University. In the coming years he wrote books in fields of history, medicine, and science. He then returned to New York as executive editor of Penthouse Magazine and Physicians World magazines.

In the 1990s, Karlen achieved a doctorate in sexology while studying for three years at an institute of psychoanalysis.
Karlen won the 1996 Rhone-Poulenc Prize for science books with Plague's Progress, but did not attend the award ceremony due to illness. In the ten years before his death, Karlen worked as a psychotherapist and kept writing articles and publishing books.

Personal life
Karlen had two children from his first marriage, which ended in divorce. He lived many years with his second wife in Greenwich Village, New York City until his death. By the time of his death, he had six grandchildren. He was also a relative (first cousin, once removed) of the pianist Mischa Levitzki and was also a relative of Irving R. Levine.

On May 13, 2010, Karlen died from emphysema. He was still working until three months before his death as a therapist in private practice.

Work

Notable works
Sexuality and Homosexuality (1972)
Huneker and Other Lost Arts.
The MacGregor Syndrome and Other Literary Losses 
Napoleon’s Glands and Other Ventures in Biohistory (1984) 
UK: Plague's Progress: A Social History Of Man And Disease; US: Man and microbes: disease and plagues in history and modern times (1996)
The Biography Of A Germ (2000)

The Biography Of A Germ
Karlen's book tracks the friends, foes and ancestors of Borrelia burgdorferi (Bb), a "silvery, wriggling corkscrew-like" bacterium which causes Lyme disease. Asides include the naming of living things and the history of germ theory. Bb is named after Willy Burgdorfer who isolated the cause of an illness affecting residents of Lyme, Connecticut.

References

1937 births
2010 deaths
American psychoanalysts
Jewish psychoanalysts
American science writers
Antioch College alumni
New York University alumni
Pennsylvania State University faculty
Writers from Philadelphia
Jewish American poets
American people of Ukrainian-Jewish descent
21st-century American Jews
American sexologists